Gradina is a village in Dolni Dabnik municipality, Pleven Province, located in central northern Bulgaria. As of December 2009, it has a population of 842 inhabitants.

References

Villages in Pleven Province